Ernesto Tito Bessone II (born 3 April 1958, in Buenos Aires) is an Argentine racing driver. He won four national championships throughout his career: TC 2000 in 1996, Turismo Carretera and Turismo Nacional Clase 3 in 2003 and Top Race in 2004.

References

1958 births
Argentine racing drivers
TC 2000 Championship drivers
Turismo Carretera drivers
Racing drivers from Buenos Aires
Top Race V6 drivers
Living people